Cruoriaceae is a family of crustose red algae – that is, a seaweed.

References

External links
 http://www.algaebase.org/browse/taxonomy/?id=5179 : Algaebase.

 
Red algae families